Noongar Radio 100.9 FM is an Aboriginal community radio station in Perth, Western Australia. 

The station is the only Indigenous radio station in the Perth metropolitan region and promotes itself as a voice to the local Indigenous community, the Noongar people, First Nations people living in Perth and non-Indigenous community members.

In January 2008 the Australian Communications and Media Authority allocated a broadcasting licence for 100.9 MHz to Peedac Pty Ltd. The callsign 6NME refers to the initials of Noongar Media Enterprises, then a Peedac subsidiary.

The station's intended market is the local Indigenous community and those interested in Indigenous culture and affairs.

History 
What would become Noongar Radio started as a segment on radio station 6NR at the Western Australian Institute of Technology, (now Curtin University) in 1979.

The Western Australian Aboriginal Media Association (WAAMA) was granted a community broadcasting licence in 1992, launching Noongar Radio. The license was revoked in 2006 following a number of complaints to the broadcasting regulator.

Noongar Radio was relaunched on 100.9 FM on Sunday 5 July 2008 after being granted a community radio licence under a new subsidiary, PEEDAC, now Kuditj.

References

External links
 

Indigenous Australian radio
Radio stations in Perth, Western Australia